In enzymology, a hydroquinone glucosyltransferase is an enzyme that catalyzes the chemical reaction

UDP-glucose + hydroquinone  UDP + hydroquinone-O-beta-D-glucopyranoside

Thus, the two substrates of this enzyme are UDP-glucose and hydroquinone, whereas its two products are UDP and hydroquinone-O-beta-D-glucopyranoside.

This enzyme belongs to the family of glycosyltransferases, specifically the hexosyltransferases.  The systematic name of this enzyme class is UDP-glucose:hydroquinone-O-beta-D-glucosyltransferase. Other names in common use include arbutin synthase, and hydroquinone:O-glucosyltransferase.

References

 
 

EC 2.4.1
Enzymes of unknown structure